D. P. Shettian (29 June 1932 – 2 September 2006) was the second Bishop - in - Karnataka Southern Diocese of Church of South India headquartered in Mangalore where the Bishop's Cathedra is placed at the CSI-Shanthi Cathedral, Balmatta, Mangalore.

Studies
Shettian pursued an upgrading course leading to Bachelor of Divinity at the United Theological College, Bangalore during the years 1960-1961 during the Principalship of Joshua Russell Chandran after which the Senate of Serampore College (University) awarded a graduate degree during the Registrarship of C. Devasahayam.

References

Christian clergy from Karnataka
Kannada people
20th-century Anglican bishops in India
Anglican bishops of Karnataka Southern
Senate of Serampore College (University) alumni
University of Mysore alumni
1932 births
2006 deaths